Telekinesis is an American indie rock project based in Seattle. Its moniker is a pseudonym for sole member Michael Benjamin Lerner, who single-handedly writes and performs the majority of the outfit's material. Telekinesis is signed to Merge Records.

History 
Michael Benjamin Lerner (born September 1, 1986) grew up in Kenmore, Washington, a suburb of Seattle. He left home at 18 to attend Sir Paul McCartney's Liverpool Institute of Performing Arts, where he studied audio recording. He is the son of the Seattle Radio presenter, Mike West (real name: Vince Lerner), now heard on Sunday mornings at Seattle's 102.5 KZOK-FM as host of Breakfast with the Beatles.

Telekinesis was signed to Merge Records in early 2009, and shortly afterward released the debut album Telekinesis! on April 7, 2009. Recorded in September 2008, the album was produced, mixed, and engineered with the help of Chris Walla (guitarist for Death Cab For Cutie), who also played on most tracks. Lerner and Walla recorded one song per day on analog tape.

Lerner cites the 1983 album Dazzle Ships, by English electronic band Orchestral Manoeuvres in the Dark (OMD), as a major influence on his work. Telekinesis covered ELO's "Can't Get It Out of My Head" for the American Laundromat Records charity album Sing Me To Sleep–Indie Lullabies, released May 2010. The outfit also covered Nirvana's "On A Plain" in 2011 for Spin magazine's exclusive tribute album, Newermind: A Tribute to Nirvana.

"Power Lines" from third album Dormarion (2013), was the title song for the Amazon show Betas (2013).

Personnel 
 Michael Benjamin Lerner - drums, guitar, bass, keys, vocals, cowbell, trombone, cello, violin, paintbrush

Touring members 
 Rebecca Cole - keyboards, background vocals (2011–present)
 Jay Clancy - bass (2017–present)
 Lance Umble - electric guitar (2015–present)

Former touring members 
 Eric Elbogen - bass 
 Nick Vicario - electric guitar
 Cody Votolato - electric guitar
 Jason Narducy - bass
 Chris Staples - electric guitar, background vocals (2009-2011)
 David Broecker - electric guitar, acoustic guitar, bass guitar (2009-2011)
 Jonie Broecker - bass guitar, keyboards (2009-2011)

Discography

Albums
 Telekinesis! – Merge, (2009)
 12 Desperate Straight Lines – Merge, (2011)
 Dormarion – Merge, (2013)
 Ad Infinitum – Merge, (2015)
 Effluxion – Merge, (2019)

EPs
 Toulouse-Lautrec – self-released, (2008)
 Coast of Carolina – self-released, (2009)
 Parallel Seismic Conspiracies – Merge, (2010)

Singles
 "All of a Sudden" split 7-inch – Architecture, (2008)

References

External links
 Telekinesis Official Page
 Merge Records - Telekinesis
 Telekinesis on Flickr

Press
 Luke Burbank. TBTL MyNorthwest.com [Video performance] (December 15, 2009)
 Luke Burbank. TBTL MyNorthwest.com Interview (December 15, 2009)

Indie rock musical groups from Washington (state)
Merge Records artists
Musical groups from Seattle